Larinyssus is a genus of mites in the family Rhinonyssidae. There are about five described species in Larinyssus.

Species
These five species belong to the genus Larinyssus:
 Larinyssus benoiti Fain, 1961
 Larinyssus iohanssenae Dimov, 2013
 Larinyssus orbicularis Strandtmann, 1948
 Larinyssus sterna Fain & Holland, 1972
 Larinyssus substerna Butenko, 1975

References

Rhinonyssidae
Articles created by Qbugbot